Terence Cooper (5 July 1933 – 16 September 1997) was a British film actor, best known for his roles in Australian and New Zealand television and film.

Biography

Born in 1933 at Carnmoney, a district of the modern-day borough of Newtownabbey in Northern Ireland, he became a stage actor and appeared in ITC British television series such as The Buccaneers and The Adventures of William Tell.

Cooper is most famous for appearing in the 1967 film, Casino Royale, a James Bond satire based on Ian Fleming's first Bond novel of the same name. Producer Charles K. Feldman kept him on a contract for two years before the film was made. He also claimed to be a candidate for the role of Bond in a Kevin McClory version of the movie series that predated Eon Productions series.

In New Zealand he starred in many New Zealand TV series such as Hunter's Gold (1977), an episode of Ngaio Marsh Theatre (1977), Gather Your Dreams (1978), Children of Fire Mountain (1979), Jack Holborn (1982) and Mortimer's Patch (1982). He played the part of Sir Arthur Conan Doyle's bombastic character 'Professor George Edward Challenger' in a 1982 New Zealand radio dramatisation of Doyle's novel "The Lost World" (produced by Peggy Wells and Barry Campbell).

In Australia, he appeared in guest roles in local drama series including Homicide, Division 4, Matlock Police, and Rafferty's Rules, with a regular role as Inspector Leo Vincetti in Bony (1992).

He was also famed as a water colour artist. He retired in Far North Queensland, Australia where he painted a collection of water colours depicting Australian tropical rain forests and birdlife.

Perhaps one of Cooper's lesser known achievements was his 1982 publication, Trouper Cooper's Curry Cookbook (William Collins Publishers, Auckland 1982). At the time, Cooper ran a successful Curry restaurant in Auckland, New Zealand, Trouper Cooper's Curry House. He also wrote The Parnell Cookbook,

Partial filmography

The Square Peg (1958) – Paratrooper (uncredited)
Oh... Rosalinda!! (1955) – Gentleman
Top Floor Girl (1959) – (uncredited)
No Safety Ahead (1959) – (uncredited)
Calculated Risk (1963) – Nodge
Man in the Middle (1964) – Maj. Clement
Walk a Tightrope (1964) – Jason Shepperd
Casino Royale (1967) – Cooper (James Bond 007)
Beyond Reasonable Doubt (1980) – Paul Temin
Jack Holborn (1982) – Morris
Trespasses (1984) – Doug Mortimer
Heart of the Stag (1984) – Robert Jackson
Pallet on the Floor (1984) – Brendon O'Keefe
Should I Be Good? (1985) – Frank Lauber
Syliva (1985) – Inspector Bletcher
Kingpin (1985) – Dave Adams
Hot Target (1985) – Carmichael
Lie of the Land (1985) – Clifford
Hot Pursuit (1987) – Captain Andrew
No Way Out (1987) – N.Z. Ambassador
Defense Play (1988) – Professor Vandemeer
The Shrimp on the Barbie (1990) – Sir Ian Hobart
The Grasscutter (1990) – Jack Macready
Old Scores (1991) – Eric Hogg
Fatal Past (1994) – David Preston
Hell's Belles (1995) – (final film role)

Notes

External links

1933 births
1997 deaths
People from County Antrim
Male film actors from Northern Ireland
20th-century British male actors